A jest is a joke.

Jest can also refer to:
 Jest (horse)
 Jest (framework)